Silvia Heubach is a German-American mathematician specializing in enumerative combinatorics, combinatorial game theory, and bioinformatics. She is a professor of mathematics at California State University, Los Angeles.

Education and career
Heubach earned bachelor's and master's degrees in mathematics and economics from the University of Ulm in 1983 and 1986, respectively. Through a program at the University of Ulm, she came to the University of Southern California (USC) for a one-year exchange, but decided to stay on for a Ph.D. program.  She completed a master's degree in mathematics in 1988 and a Ph.D. in applied mathematics at USC in 1992. Her dissertation, A Stochastic Model for the Movement of a White Blood Cell, was supervised by Joseph C. Watkins..

After completing her doctorate, Heubach held visiting faculty positions at Colorado College and Humboldt State University before joining the faculty at California State University, Los Angeles in 1994.

Contributions
Heubach is the co-author of the book Combinatorics of Compositions and Words (with Toufik Mansour, CRC Press, 2009). She is a contributor to a text in bioinformatics, "Concepts in Bioinformatics and Genomics" by Jamil Momand and Alison McCurdy, Oxford University Press, 2016.

Her research in combinatorial game theory has also included analysis of a variant of nim in which piles of pebbles are placed on the edges of a tetrahedron and each move removes at least one pebble from the set of edges incident to a single triangle of the tetrahedron.

Recognition
In 2018, Heubach won the California State University system's Faculty Innovation and Leadership Award, becoming the first professor at the Los Angeles campus of the system to be so honored. The award honored her educational initiatives including developing a new sequence of mathematics courses for life sciences students, developing flipped classroom mathematics courses, and improving statistics courses used to fulfill general education requirements.

References

External links

Year of birth missing (living people)
Living people
20th-century German mathematicians
German women mathematicians
20th-century American mathematicians
21st-century American mathematicians
American women mathematicians
Combinatorialists
University of Ulm alumni
University of Southern California alumni
Colorado College faculty
Humboldt State University faculty
California State University, Los Angeles faculty
20th-century American women
21st-century American women
20th-century German women